Tomofun is an international pet technology startup founded in 2014 by Victor Chang and mentored by Steve Chang, chairman of the global software security company Trend Micro.

Tomofun's debut product, Furbo, an interactive pet camera, was launched through the crowdfunding website Indiegogo in 2016 and became one of the fastest growing crowdfunding campaigns in history, reaching its crowdfunding goal in less than 8 hours.

Products 

Furbo Dog Camera

Furbo Dog Camera, launched in April 2016 through an Indiegogo crowdfunding campaign, is an interactive pet camera designed specifically for dogs that features 2-way audio, live video streaming, and an innovative "treat-tossing" feature that allows users to launch treats in the air in order to remotely play and interact with their pets. It has been featured in online consumer tech publications including The Verge, TechCrunch, and Gizmodo and has become one of the fastest growing crowdfunding campaigns on Indiegogo and is the best-selling dog camera on Amazon in ten countries.

Furbo Dog Camera includes a best-in-class camera quality with 1080p full HD, 4x zoom, 160° wide-angle and night vision. Designed with High quality microphone, built-in speaker, and customized snack call to mimic clicker training for dogs. The camera includes Industrial-strength 3M adhesives on the bottom to prevent it from being knocked over, Bamboo wooden cover to keep treats sealed and spill-proof. 

Furbo Dog Nanny

Furbo Dog Nanny is a premium dog monitoring service that alerts dog owners to dog activities and potential dangers in real-time. Notifications such as Dog Activity Alert, Person Alert, and Dog Selfie Alert allows dog parents to know exactly what is happening at home. Each alert is coupled with automatic cloud-recording. If users are not able to check-in, in real-time, they can go back to see what triggered strange behavior with short, event-specific video clips. 

In addition to preventing potentially dangerous situations, Furbo Dog Nanny captures moments of joy throughout the day. From play time, to mischief, to visits from the dog walker, Furbo Dog Nanny documents it all. At the end of day, Furbo Dog Nanny compiles a “Doggie Diary,” a fun highlight video that captures your pup's best moments from the day - for easy review.

References

External links 

 
 Furbo Indiegogo campaign

Software companies based in Seattle
Consumer electronics
Cameras
Software companies of the United States
2014 establishments in the United States
Software companies established in 2014
Companies established in 2014